Chamberlain Waits is the second studio album by American punk rock band The Menzingers.  The album was voted the best release of 2010, by Australian radio show Bullying The Jukebox.

Release
On January 5, 2010, Chamberlain Waits was announced for release in three months' time. Following this, the band supported Anti-Flag on their headlining US tour. On March 2, 2010, the album's artwork and track listing were posted online. On March 16, 2010, "I Was Born" was released as a single with "Mea Culpa Cabana" and "My Friend Chris" as its B-sides. Later in the month, the band performed at Harvest of Hope Fest. Chamberlain Waits was made available for streaming on Myspace on April 6, 2010, before being released through Red Scare Industries on April 13, 2010. Following performances at Rad Fest and Windy City Sound Clash festivals, the band went on a Midwest and West Coast tour with Cheap Girls. They went on a Southern and East Coast tour with Soul Control, leading up to an appearance at Insubordination Fest. In May and June 2011, the band supported Title Fight on their first headlining US tour.

Reception

"Chamberlain Waits" was Exclaim!'s No. 8 Punk Album of 2010. "Chamberlain Waits" was Punknews.org's No. 1 Album of 2010.

Track listing
All songs written by The Menzingers

Personnel
Personnel for Chamberlain Waits, according to album liner notes.

The Menzingers
Tom May – Guitar, Vocals
Joe Godino – Drums
Greg Barnett – Guitar, Vocals
Eric Keen - Bass

Guest Musicians
Brendan Kelly - Additional vocals on "So It Goes"

Production Credits
Matt Allison – Produced, mixed, and recorded at Atlas Studios
Justin Yates - Recording assistant
Alan Douches - Mastered at West West Side Mastering

References

2010 albums
The Menzingers albums
Red Scare Industries albums
Albums produced by Matt Allison (record producer)